Nouran Saleh (born 6 June 1988) is an Egyptian synchronized swimmer who competed in the 2008 Summer Olympics. Nouran is a 167 cm tall and weighs 56 kg. She was born in Giza, Al-Jizah, Egypt. She is affiliated with Surfers Paradise Triathlon Club.

References

External links 
 
 

1988 births
Living people
Egyptian synchronized swimmers
Olympic synchronized swimmers of Egypt
Synchronized swimmers at the 2008 Summer Olympics
Sportspeople from Giza